George Noah French (10 November 1926 – 19 July 2012) was an English footballer who played as a full-back in the Football League for Colchester United.

Career

Born in Colchester, French joined Colchester United in 1952 from amateur forms, making his debut for the club in a Third Division South 1–1 draw with Gillingham on 4 October at Layer Road. He made two further appearances for Colchester, with his final game coming on 19 September 1953, a 3–0 away defeat to Swindon Town. French then returned to non-league football with local club Parkside.

George French died on 19 July 2012.

References

1926 births
2012 deaths
Sportspeople from Colchester
English footballers
Association football fullbacks
Colchester United F.C. players
English Football League players